The 1940 All-Ireland Senior Hurling Championship was the 54th staging of the All-Ireland Senior Hurling Championship, the Gaelic Athletic Association's premier inter-county hurling tournament. The championship ended on 1 September 1940.

The championship was won by Limerick who secured the title following a 3-7 to 1-7 defeat of Kilkenny in the All-Ireland final. This was their 6th All-Ireland title, their first in four championship seasons.

Kilkenny were the defending champions.

Teams

Overview

A total of thirteen teams contested the championship, including all of the teams from the 1939 championship.

Team summaries

Results

Leinster Senior Hurling Championship

First round

Quarter-finals

Semi-finals

Final

Munster Senior Hurling Championship

Quarter-final

Semi-finals

Final

All-Ireland Senior Hurling Championship

Semi-final

Final

Championship statistics

Top scorers

Overall

Sources
 Corry, Eoghan, The GAA Book of Lists (Hodder Headline Ireland, 2005).
 Donegan, Des, The Complete Handbook of Gaelic Games (DBA Publications Limited, 2005).

References

1940